A braid is an interweaving of flexible strands of hair, wire, etc.

Braid(s) may also refer to:

Location

 Braid Station, a Vancouver SkyTrain station
 Braid, a civil parish in County Antrim, Northern Ireland
 Braid in Edinburgh:
 Hermitage of Braid 
 Braid Hills 
 Braid Burn

Mathematics
 Braid theory, an abstract geometric theory in the field of topology
 Braid group, a type of object in braid theory

Musical group
 Braid (band), an emo and post-hardcore band from Illinois
 Braids (band), an art rock band from Canada
 Braided, a Canadian singing ensemble
 The Braids, a duo known for their 1996 cover of "Bohemian Rhapsody"

People
 Braid (surname)
 Braids, a character in Magic: The Gathering
 Braid, a character seen on Who Wants to Be a Superhero?

Other
 Braid (video game), a 2008 video game
 Braided river, a type of river pattern
 Operation Braid, the official investigation into the murder of Joanna Yeates, a high-profile case from 2010 in the United Kingdom
 Braid (film), a 2018 horror movie

See also
 Der Zopf, German for "braid", a solitaire card game
 French braid, a hairstyle